GeneRally is a freeware racing game developed by brothers Hannu and Jukka Räbinä from Finland. Although it features a 3D graphics engine, Gene Rally has a top-down perspective. It has a similar art design to games such as Super Sprint and Slicks 'N' Slide.

Gameplay
Up to six cars (either human or computer-controlled by AI) can race at the same time on a track. The game offers three game modes  time trial mode (the player will go around the track around 3 times or more.), race mode (a race against 15 human or artificial opponents) and championship mode (season of several races). The game has a basic damage model along with tire wear and fuel consumption causing the necessity of pit-stops during the race. All the settings of the game are fully customizable (including details like separate adjustable AI level of every single AI opponent or points awarding system of the held championship).

Multiplayer
GeneRally does not support online or local (LAN) play. However, up to 6 human players can play on one computer using same keyboard or keyboard combined with other devices like joystick or game pad, and a controller.

Generally 2
GeneRally 2, the sequel to GeneRally, has been announced and is currently in the pre-alpha stage of development. A day and night cycle has already been showcased for GeneRally 2 in a video on the Curious Chicken Games YouTube channel and is expected to be in the coming sequel. A demo is also ready to play on the GeneRally 2 website which players can only play on the Unity (game engine) web player. According to the 'GR 2 Developer Blog' the demo represents maybe only 15% of the progress to the final game. The Demo has all the basic features of the original GeneRally, though now with added features. It has a dynamic shadowing feature and a day and night sequence as well, however according to the Developer Blog many additional features haven't been added yet and are under development. Respected Community player and car modeler Kimmo Kaisla has joined in with the development team to help with development and a Kick starter campaign was started on 9 June 2014.

Unfortunately, soon after the campaign launch, the team could not get in contact with Kimmo for reasons that were unknown at that moment. Since Kimmo held a major role in the development of GeneRally 2, the rest of the team was unable to deliver new updates to the bakers and this caused a knock-off effect on the whole campaign, which in the end didn't reach the funding goal. Sometime later, Kimmo let the team know that he had some important issues (not disclosed to the public) which made it impossible for him to continue the development of the game. Still, the team decided to continue working with what they had; two more posts were written in the developer blog, but then no more news about GeneRally 2 seem to have been reported ever since, despite the roadmap and the established release dates.

Elements of the game
Most of GeneRally is customizable. It is not possible to change only the models of in-game objects and the layout of the user interface, which causes, that the GeneRally is deeply customizable by 3rd-party content. This possibility allows to the player to set the game precisely to their needs and interests.

The cars
GeneRally cars are made up of a maximum of 40 polygons. Building them is done using community built tools. Most of the cars, that you can choose to drive, are fully color-customizable.

The tracks
The tracks that come with GeneRally are small and simple, unlike most current third-party tracks. An official track editor lets the user put different objects (e.g. trees, walls, bridges and buildings) around the track, and make elevation changes, draw the areas with surfaces (asphalt, grass, mud, gravel, snow or water)  and export and edit land's map into various advanced external graphic editors like Photoshop or GIMP. Every month since July 2003 the community sets up Track of Month, where the members of the community vote for the best tracks published over each month. The default game itself comes with two basic folders of tracks, an [Old Tracks] set, with a variety of creative courses, and a [World Tour Tracks] set, with courses based on several countries. They are all fictional, but some hint at or resemble real-life locations. In the recent version of 1.10, an additional track set was released by TuomoH and included in GeneRally.

Other customizable elements

Drivers
Drivers can be created within GeneRally, and each can be assigned to be either a computer-controlled driver or a human-controlled driver. If human-controlled, the commands for Accelerate, Brake, Left, and Right can be assigned. If computer-controlled, a skill level from 0200 can be chosen, with 200 being the "most-skilled". Also, each driver can choose primary and secondary colors for themselves, both of which are selected using a "color mixer" of primary and secondary colors (both in RGB scales).

Fonts
Various third party fonts for GeneRally are downloadable, rather than a TTF file.

Palettes
A palette is a file (with the extension ".pal") that allows you to change the in-game colors in order to create a specific atmosphere (fog, rain, autumn, night, etc.) or just small changes to the environment (blue kerbs, grey wooden planks, darker grass, etc.).

Competitions
The community of GeneRally has created several types of competitions to solve lack of competing to each other online. For all of them is common, that racer, who is taking a part, runs his event alone and not affected by other humans. Then he submits before set deadline predefined types of files of event to organizer (obviously savegame with full replay of his ride, then file of track, which he used and finally screenshot of game menu with after-race summary). The organizer then analyzes the files to verify their values (to prevent frauds), creates summary classification of all human drivers, merges the submitted replays and release results to public.

Types of events
Three types of events exist: race, where a human racer runs together with AI racers. The human racer with fastest race time wins. In a hotlap event the human racer has to race alone, without AI racers, and attempts to set the fastest single lap  the racer with fastest lap time wins. It's very similar system to game's mod time trial. However the term time trial has another sense in competition's terminology, it represents a combined version of race and hotlap  a racer runs a ride without AI racers like in hotlap, but on distance of several laps, trying to set as short summary time as possible like in race.

Classical event
The classical GeneRally event allows unlimited tries. The racer can choose which of his several tries will be submitted and counted by organizer into the results. It eliminates natural accidents, failures, mistakes and influence of vis maior on racing.

GeneRally World Ranking
GeneRally World Ranking is classification and statistic of each one driver, team or nation, who joined one of supported competitions. It aims to compare the performances of GeneRally racers according to their performances in various competitions and to the difficulty of these. Sometimes it's compared with various real ranks like tennis' ATP. Since March 2003 every event, which fulfills GWR's rules, is classified and racers, teams and nations taking a part are awarded by number of points according defined scales.

References

External links
Official GeneRally website
Alternative GeneRally homepage
GeneRally World Ranking
Track of the Month
GeneRally 2 Kickstarter page

2002 video games
Freeware games
Racing video games
Top-down racing video games
Video games developed in Finland
Windows games
Windows-only games